Waax (stylised as WΛΛX; pronounced "wax") is an Australian rock band from Brisbane, formed in 2012. The band consists of guitarists James Gatling and Ewan Birtwell, drummer Tom Bloomfield, and vocalist Marie 'Maz' DeVita. Waax have released two independent EPs: Holy Sick (2015) and Wild & Weak (2017). They have released two studio albums, Big Grief (2019) and At Least I'm Free (2022).

They also won the Triple J Unearthed BIGSOUND competition in 2014. Their single "Labrador" won the No. 1 spot on the independent Brisbane radio station 4ZZZ's Top 100 in 2018. In 2019, the single was voted into Triple J's Hottest 100 of 2018 at No. 88. In 2022 they again won the No.1 spot on 4ZZZ's Top 100 with their single Most Hated Girl.

History

2012–2015: Early years and Holy Sick
Waax was formed in June 2012 by Marie DeVita on vocals, bass and keys; Elijah Gall on lead guitar; Ewan Birtwell on rhythm guitar; and Tom Bloomfield on drums. Shortly after forming, DeVita moved into a strictly vocal role, and the band recruited Ariana Pelser as their full-time bassist.

Their debut single "Wisdom Teeth", released on 23 May 2014, earned the band a spot on the Triple J Unearthed stage at that year's BIGSOUND festival and lifted the band to national prominence.

Pelser left the band in February 2015, followed by Gall shortly thereafter. The pair were replaced with Tom Griffin on bass and Chris Antolak on lead guitar. Waax's next single, "I For an Eye", was released in June and added to the band's popularity. An accompanying music video was released a month later. Their newfound visibility in the mainstream also landed them opportunities to perform as a support act for Australian bands such as Kingswood, The Delta Riggs, Ecca Vandal, Emperors and Stonefield, and international bands like Guitar Wolf and Upset.

Throughout their touring, the band found time to record and release their first EP, Holy Sick. The EP was released to SoundCloud on 29 September 2014 with no prior announcement. The EP was met with praise from fans and positive reviews from critics. On 14 December, the EP was made commercially available as a digital download and on CD. Also in December, the band embarked on their first headlining tour throughout Australia.

2016–2017: Restructuring and Wild & Weak
After a brief period of restructuring, Waax released the single "Same Same" on 21 November 2016, with a music video following on 6 February 2017. Another single, "Nothing Is Always", was released on 8 March, followed shortly thereafter by the title track from their second EP, Wild & Weak. The EP was released independently on 7 June. Drummer Tom Bloomfield described the band's new sound as "something spicy, like a really hot burrito". To promote the release of the EP, the band performed a ten-date national tour.

2018–2020: Antolak's departure and Big Grief
During Fall Out Boy's Australian Mania tour, Waax opened for them as a support band at four shows from February to March 2018. Signing a label deal with Universal imprint Dew Process, Waax released their single "Labrador" on 27 April, a month after announcing they would perform a twelve-date national tour in its support. They also supported Scottish rock band Biffy Clyro on their Australian tour. During Waax's performance at Splendour in the Grass in July, former Powderfinger frontman Bernard Fanning joined them onstage to sing "Don't Wanna Be Left Out" by Powderfinger. In December, Waax performed at all three dates of the inaugural Good Things festival.

In January 2019, during the band's performance at the 2019 UNIFY festival, DeVita announced that their then-untitled debut album would be released in June. On 24 February, the band posted to their social media accounts hinting at a new single release. Later revealed to be titled "FU", the track was premiered a day early on Triple J's Good Nights program. On 9 April, a music video for the single was released. On 18 April, the band announced their debut North American tour, which was scheduled for July 2019. For unknown reasons, the tour was quietly cancelled.

On 21 April, during a performance at The Cambridge Hotel in Newcastle, frontwoman Maz DeVita was reportedly assaulted by a crowd member. She later took to social media to discuss her outrage. On 10 May, the band announced that they had parted ways with guitarist Chris Antolak. In an interview with Australian Guitar Magazine, guitarist Ewan Birtwell refused to answer a question regarding Antolak's departure. "I’m sure in the future something will be said, but I don’t really know how to tackle that one right now," he said.

On 14 May 2019, Waax released a new single, "I Am". DeVita described the song as being "about wanting to please someone so much that you forget who you are in the process." A music video for the track was released on 18 June, and the following day, the band's debut album was officially announced with the title Big Grief, and a release date of 23 August. The band also announced their new lead guitarist, James Gatling. During the week leading up to the album's release, it was spotlighted as Triple J's Feature Album, which saw all 12 of its tracks receive airtime. Big Grief premiered on the ARIA Charts at #11 (#3 Australian album, #2 on vinyl).

At a secret performance in Brisbane on 6 September, WAAX debuted a new song titled "However" (or "One Good Day"). Written following the release of Big Grief, the track alludes directly to the struggles faced by the band in the months preceding the album’s release and in the aftermath of Antolak’s firing. A studio version has not been confirmed; however, a live recording of the song surfaced on YouTube shortly after the performance.

On 22 April 2020, Waax released a cover of Julia Jacklin's "Pool Party".

2021–present: At Least I'm Free
Confusion surrounds the departure of bass player (Griffin), who no longer appeared in press photos leading up to "At Least I'm Free" and there's been no statement or clarification from the band.
On 12 August 2022, the band released their second studio album, At Least I'm Free.

Musical style
Frontwoman Marie DeVita describes the band's style as "a mixture of post-punk and alternative rock".

DeVita is the band's primary songwriter with prior assistance from then-lead guitarist Chris Antolak. On the creation of their Wild & Weak EP, drummer Tom Bloomfield shared how DeVita, while writing the lyrics, "was really getting into delving into her internal struggles and [he thought] that's what has inspired the record. Really emotive both lyrically and musically."

Members

Current members
 Marie "Maz" DeVita – lead vocals , bass , keyboards , occasional guitar 
 Tom Bloomfield – drums , backing vocals 
 Ewan Birtwell – rhythm guitar , lead guitar , backing vocals , bass 
 James "Flames" Gatling – lead guitar, backing vocals 

Current touring musicians
 Izzy de Leon – bass, keyboards, backing vocals 

Former members
 Jordan Cardenas − guitars 
 Ariana Pelser – bass 
 Elijah Gall – lead guitar 
 Chris Antolak – lead guitar, backing vocals 
 Tom Griffin – bass 

Former touring musicians
 Michael Richards − drums 
 Michael Hardy – drums, lead guitar

Timeline

Discography

Studio albums

Extended plays

Singles

As lead artists

As featured artists

Videography

Music videos

Awards and nominations

National Live Music Awards
The National Live Music Awards (NLMAs) are a broad recognition of Australia's diverse live industry, celebrating the success of the Australian live scene. The awards commenced in 2016.

|-
| rowspan="4" | 2018
| rowspan="3" | WAAX
| Live Act of the Year
| 
|-
| Best New Act
| 
|-
| Queensland Live Act of the Year
| 
|-
| Best Live Voice of the Year - People's Choice
| Marie Devita (WAAX)
| 
|-
| rowspan="2" | 2019
| rowspan="2" | WAAX
| Live Act of the Year
| 
|-
| Live Indie / Rock Act of the Year
| 
|-
| rowspan="3" | 2020
| rowspan="2" | WAAX
| Live Act of the Year
| 
|-
| Queensland Live Act of the Year
| 
|-
| Tom Bloomfield (WAAX)
| Live Drummer of the Year
| 
|-

Queensland Music Awards
The Queensland Music Awards (previously known as Q Song Awards) are annual awards celebrating Queensland, Australia's brightest emerging artists and established legends. They commenced in 2006.
 
! 
|-
| 2018
| "Same Same" by Waax (directed by Gregory Kelly, Pernell Marsden)
| Video of the Year
| 
| 
|-
! scope="row"| 2022
| "Most Hated Girl"
| Rock Award
| 
|

References

2014 establishments in Australia
Australian alternative rock groups
Musical groups established in 2014
Musical groups from Brisbane
Musical quintets
Dew Process artists